Harvey is one of two Metra Electric commuter rail stations along the line's Main Branch in Harvey, Illinois.

Compared to most stations along the Metra Electric line, including Harvey's other station at 147th Street, Harvey is quite grand in its appearance, at least in the vicinity of its given location. The station is located two blocks from City Hall, and next to Pace's Harvey Transportation Center.

Parking is available along Park Avenue and the west side of the tracks between 155th Street and a bridge for a Canadian National Railway line that crosses underneath the Metra Electric Main Branch, as well as the Amtrak line that runs parallel to it, carrying the City of New Orleans, Illini, and Saluki trains. These tracks carried the intercity-trains of the Illinois Central until 1971, and most trains stopped here. It also contains a much larger parking lot on the east side of the tracks surrounded by 155th Street, Commercial Avenue, and 156th Street.

On the evening of October 12, 1979, a switchman incorrectly aligned a switch in front of an oncoming Amtrak train, leading it to go across a now-removed crossover into a stationary freight train. The resulting crash killed 2 crew members of the freight train in what would become known as the Harvey, Illinois train collision.

Bus connections

Pace
 348 Harvey/Riverdale/Blue Island (Monday–Saturday only) 
 349 South Western 
 350 Sibley 
 352 Halsted (24/7 service) 
 354 Harvey/Oak Forest Loop (Monday–Saturday only)
 356 Harvey/Homewood/Tinley Park 
 360 Harvey/Amazon Monee Express (Amazon shifts only)
 361 Harvey/Laraway Crossings Express (Amazon shifts only) 
 364 159th Street 
 890 Chicago Heights/UPS Hodgkins (Weekday UPS shifts only)

References

External links 

Train heading north of Harvey Station (Metra Railfan Photos)
Main entrance along Park Avenue from Google Maps Street View
155th Street entrance from Google Maps Street View

Metra stations in Illinois
Former Illinois Central Railroad stations
Station
Railway stations in Cook County, Illinois
Former New York Central Railroad stations
Railway stations in the United States opened in 1856